Timothy Kennedy may refer to:

Timothy M. Kennedy (politician) (born 1976), New York Senator
Timothy M. Kennedy (general), retired Brigadier General in the National Guard of the United States
Tim Kennedy (fighter) (born 1979), American mixed martial artist
Tim Kennedy (ice hockey) (born 1986), American ice hockey player